The men's 110 metres hurdles event at the 2001 European Athletics U23 Championships was held in Amsterdam, Netherlands, at Olympisch Stadion on 14 and 15 July.

Medalists

Results

Final
15 July
Wind: 0.4 m/s

Heats
14 July
Qualified: first 2 in each heat and 2 best to the Final

Heat 1
Wind: 0.4 m/s

Heat 2
Wind: 1.2 m/s

Heat 3
Wind: 0.4 m/s

Participation
According to an unofficial count, 19 athletes from 14 countries participated in the event.

 (1)
 (1)
 (1)
 (1)
 (3)
 (2)
 (1)
 (1)
 (1)
 (1)
 (2)
 (1)
 (2)
 (1)

References

110 metres hurdles
Sprint hurdles at the European Athletics U23 Championships